Poronaysk (Shisuka-chō; Ainu: Sistukari or Sisi Tukari) is a town and the administrative center of Poronaysky District of Sakhalin Oblast, Russia, located on the Poronay River  north of Yuzhno-Sakhalinsk. Population:

History
It was founded in 1869 as a Russian outpost Tikhmenevsky near the Nivkh and Ainu settlements in the area. The Treaty of Portsmouth transferred it to Japanese control along with the rest of the southern half of the island of Sakhalin. It was renamed , said to mean "Sisi Tukari (in front of the mountain)" or "Siika (big river)" in the Ainu language, remaining under Japanese control until the Soviet Army retook the whole of the island in 1945.

After the town had been granted to the Soviet Union, it was named Poronaysk in 1946, after the river on which it stands. The river's name is from Ainu poro nay, meaning "broad river," "big river," or "growing river." Various Japanese place names such as Horonai (幌内) share the same etymology with Poronaysk.

Administrative and municipal status
Within the framework of administrative divisions, Poronaysk serves as the administrative center of Poronaysky District and is subordinated to it. As a municipal division, the town of Poronaysk, one urban-type settlement, and eleven rural localities of Poronaysky District are incorporated as Poronaysky Urban Okrug.

Economy
Poronaysk has a paper mill, as well as timber and fishing industries. Sakhalinskaya GRES power station is supplied with coal from an open cut mine close to the town.

Transportation
The town lies on the island's railway network, as well as on the main highway connecting Yuzhno-Sakhalinsk with Alexandrovsk-Sakhalinsky.

Climate
Poronaysk, owing to the cold Sea of Okhotsk surrounding the town, has a subarctic climate (Dfc) with short, mild and very foggy summers and very cold winters.

Sister city
 Kitami, Hokkaido, Japan

Notable people
 Taihō Kōki, yokozuna
Svetlana "Lana" Yudina (라나), singer-songwriter currently based in South Korea and China

References

Notes

Sources

Cities and towns in Sakhalin Oblast
1869 establishments in the Russian Empire